Nemanja Arsenijević (born 6 January 1986) is a Serbian former professional footballer who played as a forward.

Club career
After an impressive debut season with the Sloboda Užice in the Serbian League West, Arsenijević was transferred to OFK Beograd in the summer of 2004. He spent four years at the club, including loan spells to Srem, Borac Čačak, and Mladost Lučani. In the summer of 2008, Arsenijević went abroad and spent one season with the Hungarian club Honvéd.

In the summer of 2017, Arsenijević decided to retire from professional football due to heart problems, aged 31.

International career
Arsenijević represented Serbia and Montenegro at the 2005 UEFA European Under-19 Championship, scoring just one goal in the tournament, as the team lost in the semi-finals to England.

Managerial career
In 2022, he served as a coach for the Slavia FC academy program in Toronto.

Personal life
Arsenijević is the younger brother of fellow footballer Filip Arsenijević. Their father, Dušan, was also a footballer who played for Rad in the Yugoslav First League.

Honours
Honvéd
 Magyar Kupa: 2008–09

Notes

References

External links
 
 
 
 

Association football forwards
Asteras Tripolis F.C. players
Budapest Honvéd FC II players
Budapest Honvéd FC players
Expatriate footballers in Greece
Expatriate footballers in Hungary
Expatriate footballers in Israel
First League of Serbia and Montenegro players
FK Borac Čačak players
FK Jagodina players
FK Mladost Lučani players
FK Novi Pazar players
FK Rad players
FK Radnik Surdulica players
FK Sevojno players
FK Sloboda Užice players
FK Srem players
Football League (Greece) players
Hapoel Acre F.C. players
Israeli Premier League players
Nemzeti Bajnokság I players
Serbia and Montenegro footballers
Serbian expatriate footballers
Serbian expatriate sportspeople in Greece
Serbian expatriate sportspeople in Hungary
Serbian expatriate sportspeople in Israel
Serbian First League players
Serbian footballers
Serbian SuperLiga players
Serbian emigrants to Canada
A.E. Sparta P.A.E. players
Sportspeople from Užice
Super League Greece players
1986 births
Living people